Vataniakos Football Club is a Greek football club, based in Vatan, a district of Katerini. The association was founded in 1978. Their colours are white, green and red. In 2011, they promoted to Football League 2 for the first time in their history. On 8 January 2012, they achieved their first victory in professional leagues, winning F.C. Oikonomos Tsaritsanis by 2–1 at home.

Football clubs in Central Macedonia
Association football clubs established in 1978
1978 establishments in Greece